The Roman Catholic Archdiocese of Bhopal is an archdiocese located in the city of Bhopal in India.

History 
The history of the inception, growth and blossoming of the Archdiocese of Bhopal as it is today, is one that is replete with God’s boundless mercies finding expression in their fullness supplemented by dedicated human response and Endeavour 13 September 1963 is splashed in gold in the life sketch of the Archdiocese of Bhopal, as it was on this day the Archdiocese was made and Most Rev Dr. Eugene D’ Souza was appointed as its first Archbishop. Most Rev Dr. Paschal Topno SVD succeeded Dr Eugene D’ Souza in 1994 as the new shepherd. Most Rev Dr. Leo Cornelio SVD succeeded Dr Paschal Topno SVD in 2007 as the new shepherd and in October 2021 Most Rev Dr. Alangaram Arokia Sebastin Durairaj SVD became the new shepherd of the Archdiocese of Bhopal. He continues to render his services to the Archdiocese presently as the Archbishop of Bhopal.
 
The history of the Catholic Church goes back to the eighteenth century. It is said that in 1560 jean Philip the Bourborn along with the brother of Henry the IVth landed in south of India in a ship. It is said that jean was accorded a warm welcome when he reached the palace of the King Akbar in North India. It is said that starting with jean the family served the kind for about 400 years. They served in sargand, Delhi, Gwalior and then in Bhopal. When there was an attack on Christians in Sargand, and about 400 Christians were killed in 1778. Salvadore Bourborn and his family fled to Gwalior and later to Bhopal in 1785, as they were not feeling safe there. Here in Bhopal they were appointed in the palace of Begham Mamola Bibi Sahiba and Salvadore was later known as Hakim Inayat Masih. Later he was appointed as Army Chief and also as Chief Minister of a kingdom. This family of six is considered to be the first Christians of Bhopal. Later a few more was added from Italy and other places and in 1870, Bhopal is said to have more than 1500 Catholics around. This was then under the diocese of Agra and a priest used to visit Bhopal once a year for the spiritual needs of Catholics here. In 1871 the queen Isabella Bourbon gifted a four acre land in Jehangirabad, Bhopal for the construction of church and on 4 October on the feast of St. Francis of Assisi the foundation stone for the new church was laid. Today it is the cathedral of the Archdiocese of Bhopal.
 
On 1 November 1956 when the new state of Madhya Pradesh was erected, looking at the bright prospects of the central Indian state 13 September 1963 Pope Paul the VI announced Bhopal as the Archdiocese and De Eugene D’Souza was appointed as its first Shepherd. Presently the Archdiocese of Bhopal has about 71 diocesan priests, 60 religious priests, 20 religious brothers, 550 religious sisters and 10 catechists are working in the 26 parishes and 20 mission stations of the Archdiocese of Bhopal. Bhopal Archdiocese has two colleges, one pastoral centre, two Nursing colleges, 46 schools, 7 hostels, 4 social welfare centers, 4 hospitals, 5 dispensaries, 4 professional training centers, 4 schools for the physically and mentally challenged.

Leadership 
 Archbishops of Bhopal (Latin Rite)
 Archbishop Alangaram Arockia Sebastian Durairaj (4 October 2021 – present)
 Archbishop Leo Cornelio (15 June 2007 – 4 October 2021)
 Archbishop Paschal Topno, S.J. (26 March 1994 – 15 June 2007)
 Archbishop Eugene D’Souza, M.S.F.S. (13 September 1963 – 26 March 1994)

Suffragan dioceses 
 Gwalior
 Indore
 Jabalpur
 Jhabua
 Khandwa
 Sagar
 Satna
 Ujjain

References

Sources 
 GCatholic.org 
 Catholic Hierarchy 

Roman Catholic dioceses in India
Christianity in Madhya Pradesh
Bhopal
Christian organizations established in 1963
Roman Catholic dioceses and prelatures established in the 20th century
1963 establishments in Madhya Pradesh